Deva is a studio album by Deva Premal. The album received a Grammy Award nomination for Best New Age Album for the 62nd Annual Grammy Awards.

References 

New-age albums